Lake Stowe was a glacial lake that formed in Central Vermont approximately 15,000 years ago in the late Pleistocene epoch.  After the Laurentide Ice Sheet retreated, glacial ice melt accumulated at the terminal moraine.

The lake existed until the glacier had completely melted. Then it flowed out through the Lamoille River valley.

The lake was named after Stowe, near where evidence of the lake was discovered.

See also
Champlain Sea
Lake Albany
Lake Hitchcock
Lake Merrimack

References

Former lakes of the United States
Stowe, Vermont
Lakes of Vermont
Proglacial lakes
Bodies of water of Lamoille County, Vermont
Glacial lakes of the United States